Hebomoia leucippe is a butterfly in the family Pieridae. It is endemic to the Moluccas and Peleng in Indonesia.

Subspecies
H. l. leucippe (Cramer, [1775]) – from Ambon, Haruku, and Saparua
H. l. daemonis Fruhstorfer, 1907  – from Seram
H. l. leucogynia (Wallace, 1863) – from Buru
H. l. detanii Nishimura, 1983 – entirely orange, from Pelang, Banggai

Gallery of subspecies

References
 Savela, M. (2010). Hebomoia leucippe, funet.fi Accessed 30 July 2010.

Anthocharini
Butterflies described in 1775
Taxa named by Pieter Cramer
Butterflies of Indonesia